Diego Jiménez may refer to:

Diego Jiménez de Enciso (1585-1634), Spanish playwright
Diego Jiménez (footballer, born 1979), Spanish football midfielder
Diego Jiménez (footballer, born 1986), Mexican football defender
Diego Jiménez (footballer, born 1988), Mexican football forward
Diego Jiménez (footballer, born 1991), Spanish football centre-back

Other
Diego Jiménez Torres Airport, airport in Fajardo, Puerto Rico